Double Live Assassins is a live album by American heavy metal group W.A.S.P. It was recorded live during their K.F.D. World Tour in 1997. It was released in February 1998 in the United Kingdom and in the United States in June of that same year.

Track listing
All songs written by Blackie Lawless, except where noted.

Personnel 
W.A.S.P.
Blackie Lawless – guitar, vocals, producer
Chris Holmes – guitar
Mike Duda – bass, vocals
Stet Howland – drums, vocals

Production
Stan Katayama – mixing
Eddy Schreyer – mastering

References

W.A.S.P. albums
Albums produced by Blackie Lawless
1998 live albums
CMC International live albums